Lysosome-associated membrane glycoproteins (LAMPs) are integral membrane proteins, specific to lysosomes, and whose exact biological function is not yet clear. Structurally, the lamp proteins consist of two internally homologous lysosome-luminal domains separated by a proline-rich hinge region; at the C-terminal extremity there is a transmembrane region (TM) followed by a very short cytoplasmic tail (C). In each of the duplicated domains, there are two conserved disulfide bonds. This structure is schematically represented in the figure below.

   +-----+            +-----+         +-----+            +-----+
   |     |            |     |         |     |            |     |
  
  +--------------------------++Hinge++--------------------------++TM++C+

In mammals, there are two closely related types of lamp: LAMP1 and LAMP2.

CD69 (also called gp110 or macrosialin) is a heavily glycosylated integral membrane protein whose structure consists of a mucin-like domain followed by a proline-rich hinge; a single lamp-like domain; a transmembrane region and a short cytoplasmic tail.

CD molecules are leucocyte antigens on cell surfaces. CD antigens nomenclature is updated at Protein Reviews On The Web (https://web.archive.org/web/20080920090434/http://mpr.nci.nih.gov/prow/).

Human proteins containing this domain
 CD68
 LAMP1  
 LAMP2   
 LAMP3

References

Protein domains
Protein families
Single-pass transmembrane proteins